Accord Metropolitan is a five-star hotel in Chennai, Tamil Nadu, India.

History
Located on G. N. Chetty Road in T. Nagar, the hotel was initially opened as Trader's Hotel. The hotel was built at a cost of  1000 million.

The hotel
The hotel is 13 stories high and has 162 rooms, including a presidential suite, three studio apartments, six deluxe suites and nine Accord club rooms. The four dining and entertainment facilities at the hotel include Sorajima (Japanese restaurant), Royal Indiana, a contemporary Indian restaurant (opened in November 2011); Zodiac, the hotel bar; and Pergola, a rooftop restaurant at the 15th level. The hotel has three banquet halls, named Crystal, Emerald and Sapphire, to accommodate up to 1,000 guests. Design elements include grand stairways, Italian marble, and intricate gold leaf work.

See also

 Hotels in Chennai
 List of tallest buildings in Chennai

References

External links
 

Hotels in Chennai
Skyscraper hotels in Chennai
Hotels established in 2007
Hotel buildings completed in 2007